American Dreams is an album by bassist Charlie Haden featuring saxophonist Michael Brecker recorded in 2002 and released on the Verve label.

Reception 
The AllMusic review by David R. Adler awarded the album 2½ stars, stating, "This overly long quartet-plus-strings session is Charlie Haden's paean to an ideal America, made during a time that was ripe for such reflections. The band, with Haden on bass, Michael Brecker on tenor, Brad Mehldau on piano, and Brian Blade on drums, is unassailably strong."

Track listing 
All compositions by Charlie Haden except as indicated
 "American Dreams" - 4:52 
 "Travels" (Lyle Mays, Pat Metheny) - 6:46 
 "No Lonely Nights" (Keith Jarrett) - 5:18 
 "It Might Be You" (Alan Bergman, Marilyn Bergman, Dave Grusin) - 4:55 
 "Prism" (Jarrett) - 5:21 
 "America the Beautiful" (Katharine Lee Bates, Samuel A. Ward) - 5:23 
 "Nightfall" - 5:07 
 "Ron's Place" (Brad Mehldau) - 7:30 
 "Bittersweet" (Don Sebesky) - 6:46 
 "Young and Foolish" (Albert Hague, Arnold B. Horwitt) - 5:38 
 "Bird Food" (Ornette Coleman) - 7:31 
 "Sotto Voce" (Vince Mendoza) - 5:12 
 "Love Like Ours" (Bergman, Bergman Grusin) - 4:25 
 Recorded at Signet Soundelux in Los Angeles, California on May 14–17, 2002

Personnel 
 Charlie Haden — bass
 Michael Brecker — tenor saxophone
 Brad Mehldau — piano
 Brian Blade — drums
 Unidentified String Orchestra 
 Alan Broadbent (tracks 1, 3, 6, 9, & 10) — arranger, conductor
 Vince Mendoza (tracks 2 & 12) — arranger, conductor
 Jeremy Lubbock (tracks 4, 7 & 13) — arranger, conductor

References 

2002 albums
Charlie Haden albums
Verve Records albums